São Vicente (after Saint Vincent of Saragossa, the patron Saint of Lisbon, Portugal) is a coastal municipality in southern São Paulo, Brazil. It is part of the Metropolitan Region of Baixada Santista.

History

It was the first permanent Portuguese settlement in the Americas and the first capital of the Captaincy of São Vicente, roughly the present state of São Paulo. Established as a proper village in 1532 by Martim Afonso de Sousa on what was then the Porto dos Escravos ("Port of the Slaves"), operated by three Portuguese colonists who trafficked on slaves captured by allied tribes, São Vicente is titled Cellula Mater (Mother Cell) of Brazil for being the first organized town in the country. The first City Council of all the Americas was democratically elected and established in São Vicente on August 22, 1532.

A battle took place here on 3 February 1583 when three English warships attempting to trade with the Portuguese, was set upon by three Spanish galleons. The Spanish ships were repelled and retreated leaving one galleon sunk.

Geography

São Vicente is located on the western half of coastal São Vicente Island, being mostly a bedroom community for the larger and wealthier neighbouring port and commercial city of Santos on the island's eastern half. A small north–south hill range separates for the most part the two cities' urban areas, but they are contiguous in the north and on a narrow beach strip in the south. A narrow strip of land of the basin of the small Cubatão River extends west out of the central area of São Vicente, north and parallel to the municipality of Praia Grande.

São Vicente Suspension Bridge, linking the island to Praia Grande on the mainland, was constructed in 1914; a second link, the Mar Pequeno Bridge, was opened in 1981. São Vicente is linked to the capital city of São Paulo by the Imigrantes Highway and to the southern coast by the Manuel da Nóbrega Highway. São Vicente has a small fishing industry in its portion on the mainland, where there are a few small settlements.

Noted places

The Monument of 500 years of Brazil (Monumento dos 500 anos do Brasil) is a viewing platform on Porchat Island, an islet which extends from the south of São Vicente Island. The platform was designed by the architect Oscar Niemeyer (1907–2012). It faces roughly north in an imaginary line to the National Congress in Brasília, completed by Niemeyer and others in 1960.
The municipality contains part of the  Xixová-Japuí State Park, created in 1993.

Population history

Notable people

São Vicente is the birthplace of soccer player Robinho as well as kickboxer and mixed martial artist Cosmo Alexandre.

International relations

São Vicente is twinned with:
 Naha, Okinawa, Japan

Bibliography

References

External links

 São Vicente's official home page
 Portal Nosso São Paulo
 São Vicente São Paulo Brazil

Municipalities in São Paulo (state)
Populated coastal places in São Paulo (state)
Populated places established in 1532
Baixada Santista
1532 establishments in the Portuguese Empire